Caroline Wozniacki was the defending champion but did not complete in the Juniors this year.

Urszula Radwańska defeated Madison Brengle in the final, 2–6, 6–3, 6–0 to win the girls' singles tennis title at the 2007 Wimbledon Championships.

Seeds

  Anastasia Pavlyuchenkova (quarterfinals)
  Anastasia Pivovarova (third round)
  Evgeniya Rodina (quarterfinals)
  Ksenia Milevskaya (second round)
  Nikola Hofmanova (second round)
  Urszula Radwańska (champion)
  Madison Brengle (final)
  Petra Kvitová (third round)
  Naomi Cavaday (second round)
  Ksenia Pervak (second round)
  Chang Kai-chen (second round)
  Julia Glushko (first round)
  Ksenia Lykina (third round)
  Reka Zsilinszka (third round)
  Bojana Jovanovski (quarterfinals)
  Mariana Duque Mariño (second round)

Draw

Finals

Top half

Section 1

Section 2

Bottom half

Section 3

Section 4

References

External links

Girls' Singles
Wimbledon Championship by year – Girls' singles